Al Badr is a village in Mecca Province, in western Saudi Arabia.  An electrical fire at a wedding in the village killed 25 people in the courtyard of a home on October 31, 2012.  30 were injured in the blaze, which was believed to have been started by a high-voltage power line which fell, sparking, after being hit by celebratory gunfire.

References

Populated places in Mecca Province